State Correctional Institution – Pittsburgh (historically known as the "Western Penitentiary," "Western Pen," and "The Wall") was a low-to-medium security correctional institution, operated by the Pennsylvania Department of Corrections, located about five miles west of Downtown Pittsburgh and within city limits. The facility is on the banks of the Ohio River, and is located on 21 acres of land. (12 acres within the perimeter fence.)  It was the first prison west of the Atlantic Plain as well as a major Civil War prison in 1863–1864.

On January 26, 2017, Governor of Pennsylvania Tom Wolf announced the closing of this facility.

History
Western Penitentiary was designed by John Haviland and built in 1826 two miles south-east from the current facility by the architect Strickland.  The original site is now home to the National Aviary.

During Charles Dickens visit to the city March 20–22, 1842, he visited the original prison and some scholars believe he based the classic A Christmas Carol on conditions at the facility.

The original location is also famous for housing 118 Confederate soldiers after their capture in Morgan's Raid a dozen miles to the west.  It held them from August 5, 1863 until they were transferred to a military fort in New Jersey on March 18, 1864.  Although conditions were good for the time, at least eight confederates died during the winter, one while attempting escape.

The present facility opened on its current site in 1882, operating as one of the Commonwealth of Pennsylvania's first correctional facilities, which at the time, held some maximum-security inmates. In January 2005, after transferring the inmates to SCI-Fayette, the facility was mothballed. In 2007, the facility re-opened with its current name. It houses low and medium security inmates who require substance abuse treatment.

The campus was listed on the National Register of Historic Places in 2022.

G-20 Protests
During the 2009 G-20 Pittsburgh summit, the prison was used as the main processing facility for rioters and protesters that were detained and arrested during the week-long summit.

Notable prisoners 
 George Feigley, the leader of a sex cult, served part of his sentence at Western Penitentiary. In 1983 two of his followers drowned near the prison in what authorities believe was an attempt to break him out. He was first transferred to Western Penitentiary after plans for him to escape from SCI-Graterford by helicopter were uncovered. After the botched breakout in 1983, Feigley was transferred to SCI-Huntingdon.

Alexander Berkman, who unsuccessfully attempted to assassinate businessman Henry Clay Frick served 14 years the Western Penitentiary. That experience was the basis of his first book, Prison Memoirs of an Anarchist.

Nuno Pontes and five others who escaped from the prison feature in the Season 1, Episode 2 of the National Geographic TV docudrama series, Breakout. The episode is titled "The Pittsburgh Six".

Gerald Mayo, who filed a lawsuit against Satan and his servants in United States District Court.

Fictional Portrayals
The 1978 film The Brink's Job the character Stanley Gusciora is sentenced to 20 years at the "Western Penitentiary at Pittsburgh".

References

External links

 Western Penitentiary at Abandoned

Government buildings in Pittsburgh
Prisons in Pennsylvania
1826 establishments in Pennsylvania
2017 disestablishments in Pennsylvania
National Register of Historic Places in Pittsburgh